Decapsulation may refer to:

 Decapping, removing the protective cover of a microchip so that the contained die is revealed 
 Decapsulation machinery, an example of equipment used to prepare samples for microscopy
 A step in the reproductive cycle of Synspermiata

See also
 Encapsulation (disambiguation)